World Series of Fighting 26: Palmer vs. Almeida is a mixed martial arts event held  in Paradise, Nevada, United States. This event will air on NBCSN in the U.S and on Fight Network in Canada.

Background
The main event was scheduled to be a featherweight title fight between Lance Palmer and Alexandre de Almeida

The co-main event was scheduled to be a fight between Tyrone Spong and Jake Heun.

Tyrone Spong suffered an injury and was replaced by Clinton Williams, who will fight Jake Heun.

Results

See also 
 List of WSOF champions
 List of WSOF events

References

World Series of Fighting events
2015 in mixed martial arts
2015 in sports in Nevada